New Princeton is an unincorporated community in Coshocton County, in the U.S. state of Ohio.

History
New Princeton was laid out and platted at an unknown date. A post office called New Princeton was established in 1850, and remained in operation until 1860. New Princeton once contained a wood-fired blast furnace.

References

Unincorporated communities in Coshocton County, Ohio
Unincorporated communities in Ohio